José Oliver Ruíz (born September 18, 1974) is a male weightlifter from Colombia. He won a gold medal at the 2007 Pan American Games for his native South American country.

References
 NBC
 the-sports.org

1974 births
Living people
Colombian male weightlifters
Weightlifters at the 2003 Pan American Games
Weightlifters at the 2007 Pan American Games
Pan American Games gold medalists for Colombia
Pan American Games bronze medalists for Colombia
Pan American Games medalists in weightlifting
Central American and Caribbean Games silver medalists for Colombia
Competitors at the 2006 Central American and Caribbean Games
Central American and Caribbean Games medalists in weightlifting
Medalists at the 2007 Pan American Games
20th-century Colombian people
21st-century Colombian people